John Stirling Howarth (born 26 March 1945) is a former English county cricketer who played for Nottinghamshire County Cricket Club. A right-arm fast-medium bowler of some success, he is believed to hold the unfortunate record of most first-class matches played without scoring a run.

Howarth was born in Stockport, Cheshire and played for Notts in the 1966 and 1967 English cricket seasons. In 13 first-class games he took 19 wickets at an average just below 34. He is, however, best known for his remarkable record of scoring no runs in this time. A career of 13 first-class matches without a run is the world record. However, Howarth only batted seven innings in these matches (out of a theoretical maximum of 26, had he batted in two innings per game). In those he was dismissed four times for a duck, and finished not out without scoring on three other occasions, giving him a career best score of 0*. According to Lynch, the record for most innings in a career without scoring a run appears to belong to Seymour Clark, who played for Somerset County Cricket Club as a wicket-keeper in the 1930 season. In five matches he batted nine innings, with seven ducks and two scores of 0*.

Howarth, who also played for Minor Counties, had success in his one-day cricket career, although he was limited to 5 List A matches spread from 1967 to the 1977 season. He took 8 wickets at the low average of 18.12, with a strike rate of 35 balls per wicket and an economy rate of just 3.08 runs per over. His best bowling figures were 3/30, coincidentally identical to his first-class best. Howarth also had (slightly) more success with his right-handed batting, being dismissed only twice in four innings for a total of nine runs at an average of 4.50. His highest score was 5.

References

External links

English cricketers
Nottinghamshire cricketers
Cheshire cricketers
Sportspeople from Stockport
1945 births
Living people
Minor Counties cricketers